WKKQ (96.1 FM) is a radio station broadcasting a hot adult contemporary format, licensed to Barbourville, Kentucky, United States.

History
In 1974, WYWY-FM signed on the air at 93.5 on the FM dial. According to the book "Towers Over Kentucky," WYWY-FM tried big band and easy listening in the daytime with rock for the teens at night. Later on, the AM went country and the FM became adult contemporary. With the FM rule changes in the 1990s, the Engles were able to find a way to up power to 25 kilowatts by moving to 96.1 on the dial, where they put
the top country format, while turning the AM station to southern gospel. But on November 10, 2000, the station changed its call sign to the current WKKQ.

References

External links

Barbourville, Kentucky
KKQ
1974 establishments in Kentucky
Radio stations established in 1974